Ohkawa Dam  is a rockfill dam located in Kagoshima Prefecture in Japan. The dam is used for irrigation and water supply. The catchment area of the dam is 11.1 km2. The dam impounds about 19  ha of land when full and can store 2320 thousand cubic meters of water. The construction of the dam was started on 1983 and completed in 1986.

See also
List of dams in Japan

References

Dams in Kagoshima Prefecture